Nikolayevka may refer to:
Amrakits or Nikolayevka, Armenia
Jraber or Nikolayevka, Armenia
Dzerjinovka or Nikolayevka, Azerbaijan
Nikolaevka, Bulgaria, a village in Suvorovo Municipality, Bulgaria
Nikolayevka, Russia, name of several inhabited localities in Russia
Mykolaivka, name similar in meaning of several populated places in Ukraine

See also
Nikolayevsk (disambiguation)
Nikolayev (disambiguation)
Nikolayevsky (disambiguation)